PT Bank Pembangunan Daerah Kalimantan Timur dan Kalimantan Utara, doing business as Bankaltimtara, is an Indonesian regional development bank serving East Kalimantan and North Kalimantan. It was previously known as Bank Kaltim or East Kalimantan Bank until 2017 when the company was renamed after new North Kalimantan province was created. It is also one of the biggest compared to other province's regional development banks in Indonesia.

History 
The company was established by Regional Law Number 3 of 1964. As of 2018, 37% of the bank shares are owned by East Kalimantan provincial government, while the rest is distributed to government of regencies and cities in East and North Kalimantan province. As with other regional development banks in Indonesia, its commissioner is appointed directly by provincial government serving 4 years-term and managed by regional provincial laws.

References 

Banks of Indonesia
Regionally-owned companies of Indonesia
Government-owned banks of Indonesia